Martín Leonel Batallini (born 19 August 1991) is an Argentine professional footballer who plays as a forward for 12 de Octubre.

Career
Defensores de Belgrano were Batallini's first team. He scored seven times in three seasons with the Primera B Metropolitana outfit, two of which were strikes in games against Almagro. On 9 July 2013, Batallini moved across the division to Deportivo Merlo. Tristán Suárez were the opponents for his club debut, as he featured for sixty-one minutes of a 3–0 defeat. The first of his two goals for Deportivo Merlo arrived in the succeeding March versus Deportivo Armenio, before the other came in October 2014 against Atlanta. Batallini spent 2015 and 2016 with Estudiantes, prior to joining Primera C Metropolitana's San Miguel.

After two seasons with San Miguel, the first of which ended with promotion from tier four, Batallini swapped Argentina for Venezuela in July 2018 by agreeing terms with Primera División side Deportivo Lara. Four goals in his first thirteen appearances occurred, with the forward scoring in 2–0 wins over Zamora, Zulia, Carabobo and Aragua; as they lost in the Serie Final to Zamora. January 2019 saw Batallini return to his homeland with All Boys. He made five appearances for them, though just one was as a starter - his debut versus Fénix on 2 February. He left in June to spend the rest of 2019 back with San Miguel.

After scoring four times in fifteen games for El Trueno Verde, Batallini headed to Greek football in January 2020 after agreeing terms with Football League outfit Niki Volos. Eight matches and two goals soon occurred, in a campaign which ended early due to the COVID-19 pandemic. September 2020 saw Batallini return to Argentina with Almirante Brown. In January 2022, Batallini moved abroad, as he signed with Paraguayan side 12 de Octubre.

Personal life
Batallini's brother, Pablo, also played football at a professional level; notably playing alongside him whilst with Deportivo Merlo.

Career statistics
.

References

External links

1991 births
Living people
Sportspeople from Buenos Aires Province
Argentine footballers
Association football forwards
Argentine expatriate footballers
Primera B Metropolitana players
Primera C Metropolitana players
Venezuelan Primera División players
Football League (Greece) players
Defensores de Belgrano footballers
Deportivo Merlo footballers
Estudiantes de Buenos Aires footballers
Club Atlético San Miguel footballers
Asociación Civil Deportivo Lara players
All Boys footballers
Niki Volos F.C. players
Club Almirante Brown footballers
12 de Octubre Football Club players
Argentine expatriate sportspeople in Venezuela
Argentine expatriate sportspeople in Greece
Argentine expatriate sportspeople in Paraguay
Expatriate footballers in Venezuela
Expatriate footballers in Greece
Expatriate footballers in Paraguay